Isonychia bicolor, the mahogany dun, is a species of brushlegged mayfly in the family Isonychiidae. It is found in North America.

References

Further reading

External links

 

Mayflies
Articles created by Qbugbot
Insects described in 1853